VDOT may refer to:

 Virginia Department of Transportation
 VDOT, the running fitness measurement